The Soviet Union (USSR) competed in the Winter Olympic Games for the first time at the 1956 Winter Olympics in Cortina d'Ampezzo, Italy.

Medalists

Alpine skiing

Men

Women

Cross-country skiing 

Men

Women

Ice hockey 

Men
Head coach:  Arkady Chernyshev

Preliminary round

Final round

Nordic combined

Ski jumping

Speed skating 

Men

References

Official Olympic Reports
International Olympic Committee results database

Nations at the 1956 Winter Olympics
1956
Winter Olympics